Juan de Quiroga y Apaolaza (1774–1845) was a Chilean military figure from Santiago.

References

Chilean Army officers
1774 births
1845 deaths
People from Santiago